Old Catonsville High School, also known as St. Mark's School, is a historic school building located at Catonsville, Baltimore County, Maryland. It is a masonry schoolhouse which consists of a one-story, single bay structure (built in 1878) and a three-story, four bay addition (built in 1898).  In 1885 the school was designated a high school and in 1910 the property was sold to the Catholic Church.

It was listed on the National Register of Historic Places in 1987.

References

External links
, including photo from 1986, at Maryland Historical Trust

Defunct schools in Maryland
Buildings and structures in Baltimore County, Maryland
School buildings on the National Register of Historic Places in Maryland
School buildings completed in 1878
National Register of Historic Places in Baltimore County, Maryland
1878 establishments in Maryland